Mohammed Zulfiqaruddin was an Indian association football player who played for the India national football team. He was part of the Indian team that reached the Semi-final of 1956 Summer Olympics.

Playing career
Zulfiqaruddin began his club football with Hyderabad City Police FC, one of the strongest sides in Indian football.

He represented India at the 1958 Asian Games. He captained the Andhra Pradesh team in Santosh Trophy from 1955 to 1967, and also captained the Andhra Police team in nationwide competitions such as the IFA Shield, Durand Cup and Rovers Cup. After outstanding performance with Hyderabad at the 1956–57 Santosh Trophy and winning the title defeating Bombay 4–1 in final, he along with Tulsidas Balaram were called up to the India national team. He died at the age of 83 in 2019. During his international duties, Zulfiqaruddin was managed and highly influenced by legendary Indian coach Syed Abdul Rahim.

He spoke about Rahim as, "He was a master at work. He made the Indian football team a formidable unit. He had the uncanny ability of spotting talent and turning them into solid players. But he was a strict disciplinarian."

Honours

India
Merdeka Tournament runner-up: 1959

Hyderabad / Andhra Pradesh
Santosh Trophy: 1956–57, 1957–58, 1965–66

Hyderabad City Police / Andhra Pradesh Police
Durand Cup: 1957–58, 1961
Rovers Cup: 1957, 1960, 1962, 1963–64
DCM Trophy: 1959

References

Bibliography

External links
 

1930s births
2019 deaths
Indian Muslims
Indian footballers
India international footballers
Olympic footballers of India
Asian Games competitors for India
Footballers at the 1956 Summer Olympics
Footballers at the 1958 Asian Games
Footballers from Hyderabad, India
Association football forwards